Quinapril, sold under the brand name Accupril among others, is a medication used to treat high blood pressure (hypertension), heart failure, and diabetic kidney disease. It is a reasonable initial treatment for high blood pressure. It is taken by mouth.

Common side effects include headaches, dizziness, feeling tired, and cough. Serious side effects may include liver problems, low blood pressure, angioedema, kidney problems, and high blood potassium. Use in pregnancy and breastfeeding is not recommended. It is an ACE inhibitor and works by decreasing renin-angiotensin-aldosterone system activity.

Quinapril was patented in 1980 and came into medical use in 1989. It is available as a generic medication. In 2020, it was the 253rd most commonly prescribed medication in the United States, with more than 1million prescriptions.

Medical uses
Quinapril is indicated for the treatment of high blood pressure (hypertension) and as adjunctive therapy in the management of heart failure. It may be used for the treatment of hypertension by itself or in combination with thiazide diuretics, and with diuretics and digoxin for heart failure.

Contraindications

 Pregnancy
 Impaired renal and liver function
 Patients with a history of angioedema related to previous treatment with an ACE inhibitor
 Hypersensitivity to quinapril

Side effects

Side effects of quinapril include dizziness, cough, vomiting, upset stomach, angioedema, and fatigue.

Mechanism of action

Quinapril inhibits angiotensin converting enzyme, an enzyme which catalyses the formation of angiotensin II from its precursor, angiotensin I. Angiotensin II is a powerful vasoconstrictor and increases blood pressure through a variety of mechanisms. Due to reduced angiotensin production, plasma concentrations of aldosterone are also reduced, resulting in increased excretion of sodium in the urine and increased concentrations of potassium in the blood.

Partial Recall
In April of 2022, Pfizer voluntarily recalled five batches of the drug because of the presence of a nitrosamine, NNitroso-quinapril. Testing found that the amount of nitrosamines was above the acceptable daily intake level (all humans are exposed to nitrosamines up to a certain daily level by cured and grilled meats, water, dairy products, and vegetables) set by the U.S.'s Food and Drug Administration (FDA). Though long-term ingestion of NNitroso-quinapril potentially might cause cancer in some individuals, there is not believed to be an imminent risk of harm.

References

External links
 

ACE inhibitors
Carboxamides
Carboxylate esters
Enantiopure drugs
Pfizer brands
Prodrugs
Tetrahydroisoquinolines
Wikipedia medicine articles ready to translate